A mohawk is a figure skating turn that involves a change of skating foot but not a change of edge. It is a turn from one foot to the other, from forward to backwards (or backwards to forwards) in which the entry and exit curves are continuous and of equal depth (e.g. where each edge forms part of the same curve).

In Canada this turn is called a C turn. This was changed by On October 28, 2020 by Skate Canada, the governing body of figure skating in Canada. In the announcement they stated that this is done to “improve equity, diversity and inclusion”. They also said that this “works towards decolonizing their language”.

Several variations are listed, Open and Closed. These relate to where the free foot is placed in relation to the skating foot on entering the turn, before weight is transferred. A swing Mohawk is another variation that is used in ice dance. It can be either open or closed. The free leg swings closely past the skating leg before returning to the skating foot to execute the turn.

A common mohawk turn is the forward inside open mohawk.  In this turn, the skater faces into the circle and the free foot is brought to the instep of the skating foot at an angle of 90° or more, before being placed on the ice on a backward inside edge during the transfer of weight.  This leaves the former skating foot (and new free foot) in front of the new skating foot after the turn.  Along with the 3 turn, this is one of the most common ways for skaters to change direction while skating,  and is one of the first turns learned by beginning skaters.

In a closed mohawk, the transfer of weight happens with the free foot being placed behind the skating foot rather than at the instep, so that after the turn the new free foot is carried behind rather than in front.

Outside mohawks are similar, except that the skater faces outside of the circle.  Again, there are both open and closed variants.

Mohawk turns are essentially executed with crossed feet, and this is reflected in the tracings.  In a good mohawk turn, the weight transfer is executed smoothly, without jerking of the hips or upper body.  It is somewhat easier to accomplish this if the skater has open hip joints and can turn out the free foot at a greater angle before placing it on the ice, but lack of flexibility can be compensated for with careful timing.

The corresponding turns from backward to forward do not involve crossed feet and are usually considered simple steps rather than mohawks.

References

Figure skating elements